WGMD (92.7 FM) is a radio station licensed to serve Rehoboth Beach, Delaware, Sussex County and the five other counties known as Delmarva.  Celebrating its 40th anniversary in 2020, the station has been owned and operated by Resort Broadcasting Company, LLC, a privately owned company since inception. It airs a news, talk, sports radio format. The station has been assigned these call letters by the Federal Communications Commission since March 30, 1980.

On December 1, 2021, WGMD began simulcasting on WUSX 98.5 FM Seaford.

The station's registered trademark is "The TALK Of Delmarva".

Format
WGMD features 11 hours of local programming along with Mark Levin, Sean Hannity, Michael Savage and George Noory.  Weekend programming includes local talk, the Rehoboth Foodie, The Pet Show, The Car Doctor, The Dirt Doctor and Classic Radio Theater, among others. WGMD is also an affiliate of the Philadelphia Phillies and Baltimore Orioles Radio Networks, and broadcasts Phillies baseball games on Sundays and Baltimore Orioles baseball on all other days and Baltimore Ravens Football games during seasons.

Local and regional news
In 2018 and 2019 WGMD was recognized as Best News and Best Sports station downstate by the readers of Delaware Today magazine.

Additionally, WGMD News placed in the 2020 national competition of the National Federation of Press Women.

As a radio affiliate of the Maryland News Network, WGMD broadcasts daily agricultural reports, daily morning and afternoon traffic reports and other features of local and regional interests.

National news
Local and regional news is supplemented by Fox News.

Weather
Hourly Weather and Marine Weather services are provided by AccuWeather.

References

External links
WGMD official website

GMD
Rehoboth Beach, Delaware
Talk radio stations in the United States
Radio stations established in 1983
News and talk radio stations in the United States